The 2019 Pan American Weightlifting Championships was held in Guatemala City, Guatemala from 23 to 27 April 2019.

Medal summary

Men

Women

Medals tables

Results including snatch and clean & jerk medals

Total results

Team ranking

Men

Women

References

External links
Results
Results book 

Pan American Weightlifting Championships
Pan American Weightlifting Championships
Pan American Weightlifting Championships
International weightlifting competitions hosted by Guatemala
Sports competitions in Guatemala City
Pan American Weightlifting Championships